Panamao, officially the Municipality of Panamao (Tausūg: Kawman sin Panamao), is a 4th class municipality in the province of Sulu, Philippines. According to the 2020 census, it has a population of 49,849 people.

Geography

Barangays
Panamao is politically subdivided into 31 barangays.

Climate

Demographics

Economy

References

External links
 Old Panamao Profile at PhilAtlas.com
 [ Philippine Standard Geographic Code]
 Panamao Profile at the DTI Cities and Municipalities Competitive Index
 Philippine Census Information

Municipalities of Sulu